2012 World Masters Athletics Indoor Championships is the fifth in a series of World Masters Athletics Indoor Championships (also called World Masters Athletics Championships Indoor, or WMACi). This fifth edition took place in Jyvaskyla, Finland, from 3 to 8 April 2012.

The main venue was Hipposhalli,

which has a banked indoor track

where the turns are raised

to neutralize the centrifugal force of athletes running the curves. Supplemental venues included Harjun stadion for throwing events and Cross Country, shore of Lake Jyväsjärvi for Half Marathon, and Jyväskylä Harbour for road race walking competition.

This Championships was organized by World Masters Athletics (WMA) in coordination with a Local Organising Committee (LOC): City of Jyväskylä, Mikko Pajunen,Kalevi Olin.

The WMA is the global governing body of the sport of athletics for athletes 35 years of age or older, setting rules for masters athletics competition.

A full range of indoor track and field events were held.

In addition to indoor competition, non-stadia events included Half Marathon,

8K Cross Country, 10K Race Walk, Weight Throw, Hammer Throw, Discus Throw and Javelin Throw.

Golden Baton
To honour the fair play challenge of Finland's Clean Win anti-doping campaign, a symbolic golden baton was passed from the European Airgun Championships that took place in February at Vierumaki;

the golden baton was later passed to the Finland Olympic Qualification Tournament of Wrestling and World University Wrestling Championships in Kuortane in October.

Golden batons were also used by relay teams at this Indoor Championships.

Results
Past Championships results are archived at WMA.

Additional archives are available from European Masters Athletics

as a searchable pdf,

and from British Masters Athletic Federation.

as a searchable pdf.

USATF Masters keeps a list of American record holders.

Canadian Masters Athletics keeps an archive of Canadian athletes and results at WMA Championships.

Several masters world records were set at this Indoor Championships. World records for 2012 are from WMA unless otherwise noted.

Women

Men

References

External links

wma2012.jyvaskyla.fi documents
URHEILURAVITSEMUKSEN MUKAINEN RUOKAILU SUURTAPAHTUMASSA Case: Valio Oy & WMA 2012
Team USA 62 medals
Trinidad and Tobago 2 Gold Medals

World Masters Athletics Championships
World Masters Athletics Championships
International athletics competitions hosted by Finland
2012
Masters athletics (track and field) records